The Bell XP-77 development was initiated by the United States Army Air Forces during World War II to produce a simplified "lightweight" fighter aircraft using non-strategic materials. Despite being innovative, the diminutive prototype proved tricky to handle and the project was canceled when the XP-77 did not deliver its projected performance.

Design and development
The Tri-4 (Company designations, later changed to D-6 ) project with the Bell Aircraft Corporation was initiated in October 1941. Originally a design study to meet the USAAF specifications for a "very light" interceptor, the XP-77 was intended to be a small, light fighter much in the mold of the 1930s Thompson Trophy air racers.

On 16 May 1942, the USAAF recommended the construction and testing of 25 XP-77s. The aircraft featured a single-engine, low-wing monoplane with mainly wood construction, equipped with tricycle landing gear, a typical Bell feature that bestowed good ground handling. A bubble canopy also provided fair visibility except in the forward-downward direction due to the extended nose.

While originally conceived using an air-cooled  Ranger XV-770-9 12-cylinder engine with a supercharger, the prototypes were delivered with the non-supercharged XV-770-7 engine due to engine development delays. With the anticipated delivery time of the original engine delayed for one and a half years, Bell proposed that seven XP-77s be built using the seven XV-770-7 engines then available. The planned armament was one Hispano 20 mm cannon firing through the propeller hub (much like the larger caliber 37 mm moteur-canon of the SPAD S.XII) and two 0.5 inch (12.7 mm) M2 Browning machine guns, with the option of either a  bomb or  depth charge with the deletion of the cannon armament.

The mock-up inspection on 21–22 September 1942 produced some concerns from both the manufacturer and the USAAF inspection team. Weight had crept up beyond the  design limit but delays in the program were experienced when the company resorted to sub-contracting the wooden construction while the ongoing production at the Bell facilities did not allow for the XP-77 to take priority for research and development. Bell asked and received permission to reduce the production run of aircraft to two prototypes.

Operational history

Testing
The XP-77 project continued to suffer numerous delays, many related to correction of the excess weight issues. A change in subcontractor for the wing assembly also caused headaches as the first subcontractor refused to release necessary parts. Concerns over structural integrity relating to the glue and its binding properties were also difficult to resolve. With the anticipation that contract costs would soon be exceeded, and no hope that the supercharged engine would become available, the USAAF would only continue the project as an experiment to evaluate the use of wooden construction and materials in combat aircraft. The first XP-77 flew 1 April 1944 at Wright Field but the flight tests revealed vibration problems due to directly mounting the engine to the airframe, without vibration isolation. The long nose and rear-mounted cockpit also inhibited visibility relative to operational aircraft of the time.

The XP-77 proved to be difficult to fly and despite flying without guns or armor, it did not come up to the expected performance estimates mainly because it was woefully underpowered. Further trials were conducted at the USAAF Proving Ground at Eglin Field with the second aircraft, which was destroyed on 2 October 1944 when it entered an inverted spin while attempting an Immelmann, and the pilot bailed out. All development was terminated in December 1944.

Post-cancellation 

After the program's cancellation, the first prototype was sent to Wilbur Wright Field, then to Eglin Field, then back to Wright.  The aircraft was seen at various airshows before being sent to an unknown air base as a gate guard.  The aircraft remained on display for several years before deteriorating, after which it was burned.

Specifications (Bell XP-77)

See also

References
Notes

Bibliography

 Bridgeman, Leonard, ed. "The Bell XP-77." Jane’s Fighting Aircraft of World War II. London: Studio, 1946. .
 Green, William. War Planes of the Second World War, Volume Four: Fighters. London: MacDonald & Co. (Publishers) Ltd., 1961 (Sixth impression 1969). .
 Green, William and Gordon Swanborough. WW2 Aircraft Fact Files: US Army Air Force Fighters, Part 1. London: Macdonald and Jane's Publishers Ltd., 1977, pp. 25–26. . 
 O'Leary, Michael. USAAF Fighters of World War Two. Harrisburg, PA: Harrisburg Historical Times, 1986. .
 Schrader, Richard K. "Bell's Wooden Warrior." Air Classics, Volume 35, Number 4, May 1999.
 Townend, David R. Clipped Wings -- World War Two Edition. Markham: Aerofile Publications, 2010. .
 Winchester, Jim. The World's Worst Aircraft: From Pioneering Failures to Multimillion Dollar Disasters. London: Amber Books Ltd., 2005. .

External links

P-077
Bell P-77
Cancelled military aircraft projects of the United States
Single-engined tractor aircraft
Low-wing aircraft
Aircraft first flown in 1944